Tin Man may refer to:

 Tin Woodman, a character in the fictional Land of Oz created by American author L. Frank Baum
 Ted McMinn (born 1962), footballer nicknamed The Tin Man
 Tinman (born 1961), British electronic musician
 Tinsmith, a tinman or worker in tin

Film and television
 The Tin Man (1935 film), a 1935 short film starring Thelma Todd and Patsy Kelly
 Tin Man (1983 film), a 1983 film starring Timothy Bottoms and directed by John G. Thomas
 "Tin Man" (Stargate SG-1), an episode of the science fiction television series Stargate SG-1
 "Tin Man" (Star Trek: The Next Generation), a 1990 episode from the third season of Star Trek: The Next Generation
 Tin Man (miniseries), a modern re-imagining of The Wonderful Wizard of Oz on the Sci Fi Channel

Other
 The Tin Man (novel), a 1998 novel by best-selling American writer Dale Brown
 The Tin Man (American horse), Thoroughbred racehorse
 The Tin Man (British horse), Thoroughbred racehorse
 "Tin Man" (America song), a 1974 song by America
 "The Tin Man" (Kenny Chesney song), 1994
 Tin Man (Miranda Lambert song), 2016
 Tin Man, a 2017 novel by Sarah Winman
 tinman (gene), Drosophila melanogaster with mutant forms of this gene do not develop a heart

See also
Tin Men, 1987 movie
The Tin Men, 1965 novel by Michael Frayn